Martin Sloan, also referred to as Marty Sloan, is a former field hockey player from Northern Ireland who represented Ireland and Great Britain at international level. Between 1982 and 1995 he made 149 senior appearances for Ireland. Between 1987 and 1995 he captained Ireland on 107 occasions. He represented Ireland at the 1983, 1987, 1991 and 1995 EuroHockey Nations Championships and at the 1990 Men's Hockey World Cup. Sloan also made 6 senior appearances for Great Britain. He is the father of Ian Sloan, the Ireland, England and Great Britain international. Following a short retirement from hockey, Sloan has returned to the hockey field with the Sonning Sundowners to torment players across the Mens Over 40's London League.

Domestic teams

Cookstown High School
Sloan attended Cookstown High School where he was a member of teams that won McCullough Cup and Burney Cup finals.

Cookstown
Sloan was a member of the Cookstown team that won the EuroHockey Club Trophy in 1981. He also helped Cookstown win the 1986–87 Irish Senior Cup, defeating Banbridge 4–0 in last final to be played on grass. Towards the end of Cookstown career, he played in the seconds with his two sons, Stephen and Ian. He retired from playing at end of 2009–10 season. He later helped coach youth teams at Cookstown.

Ulster
Sloan also represented Ulster at interprovincial level. He played at Under-18 before going on to play for the senior Ulster team for eleven years, captaining Ulster to seven interprovincial titles.

International

Ireland
Between 1982 and 1995 Sloan made 149 senior appearances for Ireland. He represented Ireland at Under-18 and Under-21 levels before making his senior debut. Sloan was a member of the Ireland team that were silver medallists at the 1978 EuroHockey Junior Championship. Other members of the team included Stephen Martin, Jimmy Kirkwood and Billy McConnell. On 18 June 1982, aged 20, Sloan made his senior debut for Ireland in a 7–0 win against Sweden during a EuroHockey Nations Championship qualifying tournament. He subsequently represented Ireland at the 1983, 1987, 1991 and 1995 EuroHockey Nations Championships. He also played for Ireland at the 1985, 1989 and 1993 Men's Intercontinental Cups and at the 1990 Men's Hockey World Cup. On 3 July 1987 he captained Ireland for the first time in an 8–1 win against Belgium. In July 1995 he captained Ireland for the 100th time in a 4–0 win against Italy. In total he captained Ireland on 107 occasions, including at the 1990 Men's Hockey World Cup and at the 1995 Men's EuroHockey Nations Championship when they finished 5th.

Great Britain
Sloan also made 6 appearances in two tournaments for Great Britain. He played for Great Britain at the 1987 Sultan Azlan Shah Cup.  He was a member of the Great Britain training squad for the 1988 Summer Olympics. However he did not make the final tournament squad.

Personal life
Sloan is married to Adele and has two sons, Stephen and Ian. All three are also field hockey players. Adele Sloan is a former Ireland international. Between 2007 and 2013 she served as the head teacher at Cookstown High School. Stephen has played for Cookstown. Ian is an Ireland, England and Great Britain international. Away from field hockey, Martin Sloan served as a director of the Northern Health and Social Care Trust.

Honours
Ireland
EuroHockey Junior Championship
Runners up: 1978
Cookstown
EuroHockey Club Trophy
Winners: 1981: 1
Irish Senior Cup
Winners: 1986–87: 1
Ulster Senior League
Winners: : ?
Kirk Cup
Winners: : ?
Anderson Cup
Winners: : ?

Cookstown High School
Burney Cup
Winners: : ?
McCullough Cup
Winners: : ?

References

Living people
Ireland international men's field hockey players
1990 Men's Hockey World Cup players
British male field hockey players
Male field hockey players from Northern Ireland
Irish male field hockey players
Sportspeople from County Tyrone
People educated at Cookstown High School
Irish field hockey coaches
Male field hockey midfielders
Year of birth missing (living people)